The Federation of Bosnia and Herzegovina has two deputy Presidents indirectly elected by the two chambers of the Parliament of the Federation of Bosnia and Herzegovina. The President of the Federation of Bosnia and Herzegovina and the two deputy Presidents must by law be members of the three different constituent peoples of Bosnia and Herzegovina. 

Below is a list of office-holders:

See also
List of presidents of the Federation of Bosnia and Herzegovina
Presidency of Bosnia and Herzegovina

References

Politics of the Federation of Bosnia and Herzegovina
Bosnia and Herzegovina

Bosnia and Herzeg